Milton Bezerra Cabral (6 October 1921 – 15 October 2022) was a Brazilian politician. He was a member of the Brazilian Labour Party, the National Renewal Alliance, the Democratic Social Party, and the Liberal Front Party. From 1964 to 1971, he served in the Chamber of Deputies and was a Senator from 1971 to 1978 and again from 1979 to 1986. From 1986 to 1987, he was Governor of Paraíba.

Cabral died in Rio de Janeiro on 15 October 2022, nine days after his 101st birthday.

References

1921 births
2022 deaths
Brazilian Labour Party (current) politicians
National Renewal Alliance politicians
Democratic Social Party politicians
Democrats (Brazil) politicians
Members of the Chamber of Deputies (Brazil) from Paraíba
Governors of Paraíba

Brazilian centenarians
Men centenarians